Shadows of the Past (German: Schatten der Vergangenheit) is a 1936 Austrian drama film directed by Werner Hochbaum and starring Luise Ullrich, Gustav Diessl and Lucie Höflich.

The film's sets were designed by Hans Ledersteger.

Cast
 Luise Ullrich as Betty Gall/Helene Gall  
 Gustav Diessl as Dr. Hellwig  
 Lucie Höflich as Anna  
 Oskar Sima as Semmelweich  
 Anton Pointner as Emil 
 Tibor Halmay as Hayduk  
 Rudolf Carl as Inspizient 
 Gretel Berndt as Anita Roller  
 Albert Heine as Gefängnisdirektor  
 Richard Waldemar as Janos  
 Mihail Xantho as Untersuchungsrichter  
 Robert Valberg as Arzt  
 Mizzi Griebl as Garderobenfrau 
 Hella Kolniak 
 Karin Mairlechner 
 Else Pircher 
 Oskar Pouché
 Ernst Pröckl 
 Grete Wachter 
 Das Wiener Boheme-Quartett as Singers

References

Bibliography 
 Bock, Hans-Michael & Bergfelder, Tim. The Concise Cinegraph: Encyclopaedia of German Cinema. Berghahn Books, 2009.

External links 
 

1936 films
Austrian drama films
1930s German-language films
1936 drama films
Films directed by Werner Hochbaum
Austrian black-and-white films